Widelife is a Canadian electronic music songwriting and production team consisting of Ian J. Nieman and Rachid Wehbi.  They are best known for their single "All Things (Just Keep Getting Better)", which was the theme song for the television show Queer Eye for the Straight Guy.

History
Widelife collaborated with Thunderpuss on their release "Six Feet Under".  They then released a single, "I Don't Want You", which reached the top of Billboard magazine's Hot Dance Music/Club Play chart in October 2002.

The duo was soon asked to remix songs by Mariah Carey, Lamya, Deborah Cox, Soluna and LeAnn Rimes. Their next writing and production effort, "Body (Reach Out)" with vocals by Faith Trent, also went to number 2 on the Billboard dance charts.

The duo composed the theme song for the Queer Eye for the Straight Guy television series. With Simone Denny on vocals, the track was titled "All Things (Just Keep Getting Better)".  It was the lead single for the series soundtrack, reached number two on world dance charts and was in the top 20 on the Australian singles chart in early 2004. The duo has also performed their track "All Things" theme from the Queer Eye for the Straight Guy TV series on The Tonight Show with Jay Leno. The song was also featured in an episode of South Park.

Widelife later developed theme music for the television show Knock First and for Trio's "24 w/".

Discography

Singles

Remixes

Awards
Widelife won a Juno Award in 2005 for "Dance Recording of the Year" for "All Things". Widelife was nominated for "Best Underground Dance Track" and "Best New Dance Artist Group" at the IDMA 31st Annual International Dance Music Awards.

See also
List of number-one dance hits (United States)
List of artists who reached number one on the US Dance chart

References

Remixers
Canadian house music groups
Juno Award for Dance Recording of the Year winners